Ballengee is an unincorporated community in Monroe and Summers counties, West Virginia, United States.

History
Ballengee (formerly Ballangee) is named for R. T. Ballangee, an early settler.

References

Unincorporated communities in Monroe County, West Virginia
Unincorporated communities in Summers County, West Virginia
Unincorporated communities in West Virginia